John Mitchell Baker Pottinger (1913-1979) was a boxer who competed for Wales.

Boxing career
Pottinger won a bronze medal in the flyweight division at the 1934 British Empire Games in London. He lost to Georgie Coyle of New York in the New York Golden Gloves tournament during 1935.

He won the 1938 Amateur Boxing Association British bantamweight title, when boxing out of the Cardiff Gas BC.

Personal life
He was a manufacturer by trade and lived at 97 Ferry Road, Grangetown, Cardiff in 1935.

References

1913 births
1979 deaths
Welsh male boxers
Commonwealth Games bronze medallists for Wales
Commonwealth Games medallists in boxing
Boxers at the 1934 British Empire Games
Flyweight boxers
Medallists at the 1934 British Empire Games